Monument of the Martyrs of Internal Security is a memorial and military cemetery in Erzincan Province, Turkey dedicated to 1887 Turkish troops under the Third Army killed by PKK militias in the Kurdish–Turkish conflict (1978–present). Names of all 1887 KIA's are known and written on walls of the monument.

References 

Monuments and memorials in Turkey
Turkish military memorials and cemeteries
Monuments and memorials in Erzincan